The Associação de Escoteiros de Macau (Scout Association of Macau) is the national Scouting association in Macau, China. It is an Associate Member of the Asia-Pacific Region of the World Organization of the Scout Movement, and became a Full Member of WOSM on 16 August 2017 during the 2017 World Scout Conference.

Scouting in Macau began in 1911 with Chinese and Portuguese Scout troops. Shortly after, Scouts from China and Portugal started their troops in various schools and communities. The Associação de Escoteiros de Macau was founded on 12 December 1983 with 200 members, revitalizing local Scouting after decades of dormancy. When Macau was transferred from Portuguese administration to China in December 1999, the future of Scouting in Macau seemed uncertain, but as a Special Administrative Region of the People's Republic of China, Macanese institutions are allowed to continue as before. On 20 December 1999, China resumed administration over Macau. The AEM revised the verses of the Scout Promise and the Cub Scout Promise, which were introduced at the annual Scouts Rally Day in 2000.

Macau Scouts visibly render services in charity and community activities including the Charity Walk for Millions, the Green Day, the East Asian Games, the Asian Indoor Games, as well as guiding voters in Macanese elections. In recognition, AEM was awarded the Outstanding Youth Organization Award in 1998 and the Medal of Philanthropic Merit in 2001. Macau has participated in numerous international events throughout Asia as well as Europe.

The Grupo Escuteiro Lusófono de Macau (Lusophone Scout Group of Macau) participates in the activities of the Comunidade do Escutismo Lusófono.

Catholic members participate in International Catholic Conference of Scouting activities.

Program sections and ideals

 Cub Scouts: 7 to 11
 Scouts: 12 to 15
 Rovers: 16 to 20

The Scout Motto is 隨時準備 in Chinese and Sempre Pronto in Portuguese.

Scout Oath

Chinese:
我謹以至誠宣誓：
　對國家，對澳門，對信仰要負責；
　對別人，要幫助；
　對規律，要遵行。

Portuguese:

Prometo pela minha honra por amar e servir fielmente à minha religião e à minha terra, auxiliar o próximo, obedecer à Lei do Escoteiro.

English translation:

On my honour, I promise that I will do my best to my Country, to Macau, and to my religion, to help other people and to keep the Scout Law.

Leaders

Each Group is headed by a Group Scout Leader and assisted by an Assistant Group Scout Leader.

Emblem

The emblem of the Scouting Association of Macau is based on Macau colonial past. A gold fleur-de-lis shared with the symbol of world Scouting movement. Within the fleur-de-lis is an escutcheon based on Macau's colonial coat of arms before 1999 (elements consisting of the five blue escutcheons from the coat of arms of Afonso I of Portugal, five green and white waves and a gold Chinese dragon on blue background holding a blue escutcheon from Afonso I of Portugal) The lower portions of the emblem is the Scouting motto: Sempre Pronto (Portuguese) and "隨時準備" (Chinese) meaning Always Ready in English.

Headquarters

The Scouts' headquarters is The Fortress at Jardim Camoes, a 150-year-old well-preserved Portuguese-style fortress dating from colonial Macau and a famous tourist spot in the city. The Fortress was offered to the AEM in 1999 by the former Macau government, in appreciation of the contribution made by the Scouts and in supporting further development of Scouting in Macau.

Organization
The organization is protected under Macau Basic Law Article 127 under Chapter VI Culture and Social Affairs.

Chief Commissioner

The Scout Association of Macau is headed by a Chief Commissioner and as of 2016 is led by Francisca Vong (黃健清).

Ranks
 Chief Commissioner
 Deputy Chief Commissioner
 Department Commissioner
 Assistant Department Commissioner
 Chief of Division
 Assistant Chief of Division
 Trainer
 Assistant HQ Scout Leader
 Head Scouter
 Group Scout Leader
 Assistant Group Scout Leader
 Venture Scout Leader
 Venture Scout
 Scout Leader
 Scout
 Cub Scout Leader
 Cub Scout

Groups
The association has 36 groups with a total of about 5000 members.

See also
 Scouting and Guiding in Mainland China
 The Scout Association of Hong Kong

References

External links
 Official website

Culture of Macau
Organisations based in Macau
World Organization of the Scout Movement member organizations
Organizations established in 1983
1983 establishments in Macau
Scouting and Guiding in Macau